Ernestina Abambila (born 30 December 1998) is a Ghanaian professional footballer who plays as an attacking midfielder and defensive midfielder for UKS SMS Łódź in the Polish women's Ekstraliga. Abambila is the first Ghanaian to score in the UEFA Women's Champions League. She made her senior international debut for the Ghana women's national football team against France in 2017 at the age of 18.

Club Performance
In 2016, Abambila signed a two-year contract with Youngstown State. Abambila began her professional career after finishing university. She signed for Belarusian Premier League (women) side FC Minsk. She became the first Ghanaian to score in the UEFA Women's Champions League when FC Minsk beat Ljubljana in the group stage of the 2017-18 UEFA Women's Champions League.

International career

Abambila had her FIFA debut at the 2014 FIFA U-17 Women's World Cup hosted by Costa Rica in 2014. Her debut game was against North Korea that ended 2–0 to Ghana.

Honors

Club
FC Minsk
Belarusian Premier League (women) winner 2017
Belarusian Women's Cup winner 2017

See also
List of Ghana women's international footballers

References

External links
 

1998 births
Living people
Women's association football midfielders
Ghanaian women's footballers
Ghana women's international footballers
Mississippi Valley State Devilettes soccer players
Youngstown State Penguins women's soccer players
FC Minsk (women) players
Primera División (women) players
Sporting de Huelva players
Ghanaian expatriate footballers
Ghanaian expatriate sportspeople in the United States
Expatriate women's soccer players in the United States
Ghanaian expatriate sportspeople in Belarus
Expatriate women's footballers in Belarus
Ghanaian expatriate sportspeople in Greece
Expatriate women's footballers in Greece
Ghanaian expatriate sportspeople in Sweden
Expatriate women's footballers in Sweden
Ghanaian expatriate sportspeople in Spain
Expatriate women's footballers in Spain
Ghanaian expatriate sportspeople in Poland
Expatriate women's footballers in Poland
Medyk Konin players
Ghanaian expatriate women's footballers
Hasaacas Ladies F.C. players